The Nandi Award for Best Female Comedian winners was commissioned since 1996:

References

Female Comedian
Awards for actresses